The Sydney College of Divinity (SCD) is a consortium of Christian theological educational institutions and Bible colleges based in Sydney, New South Wales, Australia. The college is structured as a federation of member institutions, each of which retains its autonomy and respective theological traditions. Member institutions represent a range of Christian churches.

SCD is a registered Higher Education Provider, with degrees and awards accredited by the Australian Government Tertiary Education Quality and Standards Agency, a regulatory and quality agency for higher education. The consortium offers undergraduate awards that meet Australian and Korean education standards, postgraduate qualifications by coursework and research that meet Australian standards, and postgraduate qualifications by coursework that meet Korean standards. Awards range from Diploma in Theology to Doctor of Theology (Th.D.) and Doctor of Philosophy (Ph.D.).

In Australia, seminaries which deliver instruction and prepare people for religious ordination are sometimes separate from theological educational institutions.

Member institutions
Australian College of Christian Studies
Australian College of Ministries (ACOM)Churches of Christ
Booth CollegeThe Salvation Army in Australia
Catholic Institute of Sydney (CIS)Roman Catholic Church
Emmaus Bible CollegeChristian Community Churches to 2017 when it amalgamated with the Australian College of Christian Studies
Nazarene Theological College (NTC)Church of the Nazarene
College of Clinical Pastoral EducationInterdenominational
St Andrew's Greek Orthodox Theological CollegeEastern Orthodox Church
St Cyril's Coptic Orthodox Theological CollegeCoptic Orthodox Church

Affiliated institutions
In Australia
Australian Catholic University
Edith Cowan University
The University of Sydney
University of Western Sydney
In Korea
Chongshin University and Theological Seminary
Soongsil University 
Sungkyul University

Notable alumni
Peter Nguyen Van Hung, anti-human trafficking activist in Taiwan
Graham Joseph Hill, former principal of Stirling Theological College

References

External links
Sydney College of Divinity website

Seminaries and theological colleges in New South Wales
1983 establishments in Australia